Ferenc Németh (born ), also commonly known as François Németh, was a Hungarian-French professional basketball player. He played at the center position. He was named one of FIBA's 50 Greatest Players in 1991.

Professional career
During his club playing career, Németh won 4 French League championships, in the years 1948, 1949, 1950, and 1951. He also led the French League in scoring, in 1950 and 1951.

National team career
Németh helped lead the senior Hungarian national team, to a bronze medal at the EuroBasket 1946, earning MVP honours in the process. Németh averaged 11.8 points per game in the tournament. He also played at the EuroBasket 1947, where he averaged 9.3 points per game.

References

External links
 FIBA.com Profile
 FIBA Europe Profile

Year of birth uncertain
Possibly living people
ASVEL Basket players
Centers (basketball)
French men's basketball players
Hungarian men's basketball players
Paris Racing Basket players
Union athlétique de Marseille players
Hungarian emigrants to France